The Yangpu Bridge is a sister bridge to the Nanpu Bridge, both crossing the Huangpu River in Shanghai, China. Yangpu is among the world's longest bridges, with a total length of 8354 meters. Its longest span of 602 m makes it one of the longest cable-stayed bridges in the world. It carries the Inner Ring Road from the Yangpu District in Puxi to the Pudong New Area. It was completed in September 1993 and opened in October. It is the last vehicular bridge over the Huangpu River before the river empties into the sea.

The bridge was designed by the Shanghai Municipal Engineering Design Institute, Shanghai Urban Construction College, and Shanghai Urban Construction Design Institute, with assistance from Holger S. Svensson. It was built by the Shanghai Huangpujiang Bridge Engineering Construction company.

It is a double-tower and double-cable-stayed bridge, with the bridge proper (the part that spans the river) 1172 m long. Its 30.35 m width carries six lanes of traffic (three for each direction).
Its two pylons reach 223 m in height. The highest ship clearance is 48 m, a necessity due to the heavy river traffic.

As of 2006, it carries more than 100,000 vehicles per day.

The two main abutments support high, upside-down Y-shaped towers (or pylons) from which the supporting cables are strung. There are two two-meter-wide sightseeing sidewalks on both sides of the bridge.

The bridge was originally unpainted; it was coated with red paint for the millennium. The name Yangpu Bridge (杨浦大桥) inscribed on each pylon was originally hand-written by Deng Xiaoping.

Sources 

 
 Marilyn Shea, Shanghai, Yang Pu Bridge

References

Cable-stayed bridges in China
Bridges in Shanghai
Bridges completed in 1993
Transport in Shanghai
1993 establishments in China
Yangpu District
Pudong